Kasese District is a district in Western Uganda. Like most other Ugandan districts, the town of Kasese is the site of the district headquarters.

History 

In September 2022, the district was hit by deadly landslides.

Location
Kasese District is located along the equator. It is bordered by Kabarole District to the north, Kamwenge District and Kitagwenda District to the east, Rubirizi District to the south, and the Democratic Republic of the Congo to the west.

Geography
Kasese District is part of the Rwenzururu Kingdom, which is coterminal with the Rwenzururu sub-region, home to an estimated 810,400 inhabitants as f 2022, according to the national census conducted that year. The sub region consists of Bundibugyo District, Ntoroko District, and Kasese District.

Population
In 1991, the district population was estimated at about 343,600. The 2002 national census put the population of the district at approximately 523,000. It is estimated that in 2014, the population of the district was approximately 694,987.

Ethnicities

Kasese is a multi-ethnic district with many people of different ethnic backgrounds. The main languages and ethnic groups that dominate the area are Rutooro and Rukonjo, the languages of the Batooro and the Bakonjo people respectively. However, there are other ethnic groups in the district who include the Banyankole, the Basongora the Bakiga and the Baganda. There is also common usage of English and Swahili.

Economic activities

Kasese district is mainly agricultural with over 85 percent of the people being peasant farmers who depend on subsistence farming for their livelihood.  It has two rainy seasons that come between March to May and August to November. Temperatures normally range between 23 °C and 30 °C. Crops grown include:

 Millet
 Cassava
 Maize
 Sorghum
 Groundnuts
 Beans
 Irish Potatoes
 Sweet potatoes
 Matooke
 Passion fruit
 Tomatoes
 Cabbage
 Cotton
 Oranges
 Coffee
 Chili peppers
 Mangoes
 Pineapples
 Pears
 Apples
 Sugar cane

Most of the agricultural produce is either sold locally or transported for sale in Kampala and to other cities and towns in Uganda. Fish farming is slowly taking root in the district and demand for the fish is high both locally and in neighboring countries. Livestock kept in the district includes: Cattle, goats, pigs and poultry. Fishing also occurs on Lake George and on smaller crater lakes in the district. There are two main landing sites on the shores of Lake George, Mahyoro and Kayinja.

The district's main border crossing is Mpondwe, where some 25,000 people cross to and from the Democratic Republic of Congo every day.

See also
 Kasese
 Rwenzururu sub-region

References

External links
Kasese District Information Portal
The Evolution of Ugandan Districts

 
Rwenzururu sub-region
Districts of Uganda
Western Region, Uganda